Nkosi Tafari Burgess (born March 23, 1997) is an American professional soccer player who plays as a defender for Major League Soccer club FC Dallas.

Career

College 
Tafari began playing college soccer at the University of Connecticut in 2015. He redshirted his Freshman season, before going on to make 46 appearances for the Huskies, scoring 1 goal and tallying 1 assist between 2016 and 2018. In 2019, Tafari played his senior season at Seattle University, making 20 appearances and again tallying a single goal and an assist on his way to been named WAC Defensive Player of the Year and United Soccer Coaches All-Region First Team.

Professional 
On January 9, 2020, Tafari was selected 14th overall in the 2020 MLS SuperDraft by FC Dallas. He signed with the club on February 18, 2020.

He made his professional debut on October 3, 2020, starting for Dallas' USL League One affiliate side North Texas SC in a fixture against Fort Lauderdale CF.

He scored his first professional goal with FC Dallas on August 21, 2021, against the Houston Dynamo.

Personal
In 2021, Tafari announced he would go by his middle name Tafari instead of Burgess, choosing to distance himself from the name that been "passed down from master to slave" and saying "I want to get back to my own roots and be proud of being African". He is of Ethiopian descent through his mother.

References

External links 
 Nkosi Tafari | FC Dallas FC Dallas bio
 Nkosi Tafari - 2019 - Men's Soccer University of Seattle bio
 Nkosi Tafari - Men's Soccer UConn bio
 

1997 births
American soccer players
American people of Ethiopian descent
Association football defenders
FC Dallas draft picks
FC Dallas players
Living people
North Texas SC players
People from Deer Park, New York
Seattle Redhawks men's soccer players
Soccer players from New York (state)
UConn Huskies men's soccer players
USL League One players
21st-century African-American sportspeople
Major League Soccer players